Darguina District is a district of Béjaïa Province, Algeria.

Municipalities
The district is further divided into 3 municipalities:
Darguina
Aït Smaïl
Taskriout

References

Districts of Béjaïa Province